Waryongsan is a mountain of Gyeongsangnam-do, southeastern South Korea. It has an elevation of 799 metres.

See also
List of mountains of Korea

References

Sacheon
Mountains of South Gyeongsang Province